The Phyllis Wheatley YWCA is a Young Women's Christian Association building in Washington, D.C., that was designed by architects Shroeder & Parish and was built in 1920.  It was listed on the National Register of Historic Places in 1983.

It is named for Phillis Wheatley (1753–1784), who was likely the first black woman professional poet and writer in the United States.

According to its National Register nomination, "The "Y" building is typical of the Colonial Revival institutional architecture so prevalent in the District and the United States during the 1920s and 1930s."  It is four stories tall over a raised basement, and is built of red brick with a corbeled brick cornice.

References

External links
 
 

Clubhouses on the National Register of Historic Places in Washington, D.C.
YWCA buildings
YWCA
Clubhouses in Washington, D.C.
Colonial Revival architecture in Washington, D.C.
1920 establishments in Washington, D.C.
Buildings and structures completed in 1920
Individually listed contributing properties to historic districts on the National Register in Washington, D.C.
District of Columbia Inventory of Historic Sites
Shaw (Washington, D.C.)
Women in Washington, D.C.